In 2008 Queen's University Belfast's Institute of Electronics, Communications and Information Technology (ECIT) was chosen to host the Centre for Secure Information Technologies (CSIT''), one of only seven UK Innovation and Knowledge Centres (IKCs). Funded by the Engineering and Physical Sciences Research Council (EPSRC) and UK Technology Strategy Board, IKCs are a key component of the UK's approach to the commercialisation of emerging technologies through creating early stage critical mass in an area of disruptive technology. CSIT is recognised by GCHQ and EPSRC as an Academic Centre of Excellence in Cyber Security Research (ACEs-CSR). It was one of the first tranche of eight UK universities conducting world class research in the field of cyber security recognised as ACE-CSRs in 2012. CSIT also an annual World Cyber Security Technology Research Summit''' at the ECIT Institute in Belfast.

References

External links
 The Centre for Secure Information Technologies (CSIT)
 The Institute of Electronics, Communications and Information Technology
 Queen's University Belfast

Computer science education in the United Kingdom
Cybercrime in the United Kingdom
Engineering and Physical Sciences Research Council
Information technology organisations based in the United Kingdom
Queen's University Belfast